St. Mark's Church is a partially destroyed Roman Catholic church in the former city of Variazh (Waręż), in Lviv Oblast of western Ukraine. It was designed in the early Baroque style by Wojciech Lentarowicz and built during 1688-1693.

A fire in 1796 burned down the church's two towers; they were rebuilt afterwards, but were lower than they were originally.

Inside the church are the remnants of fresco work dating back to the second half of the 18th century.

References

External links
 

Buildings and structures in Lviv Oblast
Former churches in Ukraine
Churches completed in 1693
1693 establishments in Europe
Former Roman Catholic church buildings
Baroque church buildings in Ukraine